The 1939 U.S. Open was the 43rd U.S. Open, held June 8–12 at Philadelphia Country Club in Gladwyne, Pennsylvania, a suburb northwest of Philadelphia. Byron Nelson won after two playoff rounds to prevail against Craig Wood and Denny Shute to claim his only U.S. Open title, and the second of his five major championships. It was the first playoff at the U.S. Open in eight years and the first three-way playoff since 1913.

Sam Snead led after each of the first two rounds but his triple-bogey on the 72nd hole dropped him to fifth place, two strokes back. Two years earlier, he was runner-up in his first U.S. Open in 1937. Following World War II, Snead finished second three more times, but never won the title to complete a career grand slam.

In his fourth U.S. Open, Ben Hogan made his first 36-hole cut at the championship and finished in a tie for 62nd. He finished in a tie for fifth the following year; after the war he won four U.S. Opens and contended in numerous others. He made every subsequent cut he played in at the U.S. Open, the last in 1967 at age 54.

Past champions in the field

Made the cut

Missed the cut 

Source:

Round summaries

First round
Thursday, June 8, 1939

Second round
Friday, June 9, 1939

Source:

Third round
Saturday, June 10, 1939 - (morning)

Source:

Final round
Saturday, June 10, 1939 - (afternoon)

Nelson began the final round on Saturday afternoon five strokes back of leader Johnny Bulla and shot 68 to gain the clubhouse lead at 284. Wood birdied the 18th to also get to 284, while Shute also finished on that number after a bogey at 17. It appeared, however, that that number would not be enough. Snead stood on the par-5 18th needing only a par to win the championship. Snead believed he needed a birdie to win and played the hole aggressively. After finding two bunkers, he made a triple-bogey 8 and missed the playoff by two strokes.

(a) denotes amateur
Source:

Playoff 
Sunday, June 11, 1939
Monday, June 12, 1939

In the three-way 18-hole playoff on Sunday afternoon, Nelson and Wood each carded 68 (–1), while Shute shot a 76 (+7) and was eliminated. In the second 18-hole playoff on Monday morning, Nelson took control at the third hole with a birdie while Wood double-bogeyed. At the next hole, Nelson holed out for an eagle to take a five-stroke lead. With a three-shot lead at the turn, Nelson matched Wood on the back nine and finished with a 70 to Wood's 73.

Scorecards
Sunday, June 11, 1939

Source:

Monday, June 12, 1939

Cumulative playoff scores, relative to par
{|class="wikitable" span = 50 style="font-size:85%;
|-
|style="background: Red;" width=10|
|Eagle
|style="background: Pink;" width=10|
|Birdie
|style="background: PaleGreen;" width=10|
|Bogey
|style="background: Green;" width=10|
|Double bogey
|}
Source:

References

External links
USOpen.com - 1939

U.S. Open (golf)
Golf in Pennsylvania
U.S. Open
U.S. Open
Philly Pennsylvania
June 1939 sports events